Mahieddine Khalef (born January 17, 1944, in Mechra Bel Ksiri, Morocco) is an Algerian football (soccer) manager. Most notably he was the co-manager of the Algeria national football team in the 1982 FIFA World Cup, together with Rachid Mekloufi, where Les Fennecs caused a sensation by defeating European reigning champions West Germany for their first world cup appearance. Despite this achievement, Algeria went on to be eliminated at the end of the group stage, thanks to a convenient result for both West Germany and Austria in their fixture, in what is known as the Disgrace of Gijon.

References

Algerian football managers
1982 FIFA World Cup managers
1944 births
Living people
Algeria national football team managers
JS Kabylie managers
People from Rabat-Salé-Kénitra
Algerian expatriates in Morocco
1980 African Cup of Nations managers
1982 African Cup of Nations managers
1984 African Cup of Nations managers
21st-century Algerian people